Charles Eishmel Bond (January 5, 1914September 24, 1989) was a football offensive tackle in the National Football League (NFL) for the Washington Redskins.  Chuck played college football at the University of Washington where he lettered in 1934, '35, and '36. Bond was the team captain for the 1936 season and was named to the  1936 All-Pacific Coast football team.

Bond was drafted in the fifth round of the 1937 NFL Draft by the Boston Redskins. Bond was backup tackle for the NFL Champion Washington Redskins (by the time the 1937 season started the Redskins had moved to Washington, D.C.).

References

External links

1914 births
1989 deaths
American football offensive tackles
People from Fairland, Oklahoma
Washington Huskies football players
Washington Redskins players